Seven Types of Six is the second studio album by British electro duo Bell, released by Soul Jazz Records on 7 June 2004. It was recorded over a four-year period after their first album, Numbers. The album is described as having interest from Andy Weatherall and Carl Craig.

Reception

Andy Kellman of AllMusic described Seven Types of Six as "Enough to keep the attention of any IDM head, but [having] a definite emphasis on the dancefloor".

Track listing

References

2004 albums
Soul Jazz Records albums